The following is a list of Seth MacFarlane's Cavalcade of Cartoon Comedy episodes. Including the episodes released online, the release of the DVD, Blu-ray and UMD Video editions saw 27 exclusive episodes.

Series overview

† A few shorts were later released online with censored language and dialogue between February to April 2010.

Online release (2008–2009)

Exclusively on DVD: (2009; 2010)
The remaining 27 shorts were all released with the previous 23 released shorts on DVD and Blu-Ray on May 12, 2009. The few shorts that were later uploaded to YouTube in 2010 but were censored for language. Since these shorts weren't released separately with ending credits, it's currently unknown who wrote, directed, and voiced the following shorts.

See also
List of Family Guy episodes

References

Lists of web series episodes